Zaina Kapepula (born 14 August 1975) is a Congolese basketball player. She competed in the women's tournament at the 1996 Summer Olympics.

References

1975 births
Living people
Democratic Republic of the Congo women's basketball players
Olympic basketball players of the Democratic Republic of the Congo
Basketball players at the 1996 Summer Olympics
People from Lubumbashi